Archduke Franz Ferdinand was the heir to the Austro-Hungarian throne whose assassination precipitated World War I.

Franz Ferdinand may also refer to:
 Franz Ferdinand (band), a Scottish rock music group
Franz Ferdinand (album), their debut album
 Franz Ferdinand (DVD)
 SMS Erzherzog Franz Ferdinand, a warship named after the archduke
 Franz Ferdinand, a character from the Alfred J. Kwak cartoon series
 Franz Ferdinand von Rummel, Prince-Bishop of Vienna and tutor of Joseph I
 Franz Ferdinand Richter, German Baroque painter
 Franz Ferdinand Benary, 19th century German orientalist and exegete
 Franz Ferdinand Schulze, 19th century German chemist and microbiologist
 Franz Ferdinand Heymann, British physicist and professor

See also
 Frans Blom, a Danish explorer and archaeologist, also known as Frants Ferdinand Blom
 Franz von Dingelstedt, a German poet, also known as Franz Ferdinand, Freiherr von Dingelstedt